Book Club: The Next Chapter is an upcoming American romantic comedy film, written and directed by Bill Holderman, and starring Diane Keaton, Jane Fonda, Candice Bergen and Mary Steenburgen. The film is a sequel to 2018 film Book Club.

Book Club: The Next Chapter is scheduled to be released on May 12, 2023 by Focus Features. Unlike the first film, Paramount Pictures is not involved with the production.

Premise
Four best friends take their book club to Italy for the fun girls' trip they never had. When things go off the rails and secrets are revealed, their relaxing vacation turns into a once-in-a-lifetime cross-country adventure.

Cast
 Diane Keaton as Diane
 Jane Fonda as Vivian
 Candice Bergen as Sharon 
 Mary Steenburgen as Carol 
 Andy García as Mitchell
 Don Johnson as Arthur
 Craig T. Nelson as Bruce 
 Giancarlo Giannini
 Hugh Quarshie
 Vincent Riotta

Production 
In May 2022, Variety announced that Book Club 2: The Next Chapter, began production with Keaton, Fonda, Bergen, Steenburgen, Garcia, Johnson, and Nelson reprising their roles from the first film. Focus Features will replace Paramount Pictures as distributor in the United States, with Universal Pictures distributing in other markets.

Release

Book Club: The Next Chapter is scheduled to be released on May 12, 2023 by Focus Features.

References

External links 
 
Upcoming films
2023 films
2023 romantic comedy films
2020s female buddy films
2020s American films
2020s English-language films
Films set in Italy